Dominik Perler (born 17 March 1965) is a Swiss philosopher.
He was born in Freiburg im Üechtland (Fr. Fribourg)

Perler studied philosophy at the University of Fribourg, University of Bern and University of Göttingen.  After finishing his PhD thesis at the University of Fribourg in 1991, Perler was a visiting scholar at Cornell University and at UCLA. After he was granted Habilitation in 1995 at the University of Göttingen, he became professor at the University of Basel in 1997. In 2003 Perler took up a professorship in theoretical philosophy at the Humboldt University of Berlin.

In 2006, Perler received the Gottfried Wilhelm Leibniz Prize of the Deutsche Forschungsgemeinschaft, the highest honour awarded in German research.

References
 Profile at Deutschen Forschungsgesellschaft (in German)

1965 births
Living people
Swiss philosophers
University of Göttingen alumni
University of Bern alumni
University of Fribourg alumni
University of California, Los Angeles alumni
Cornell University alumni
Academic staff of the University of Basel
Academic staff of the Humboldt University of Berlin
Gottfried Wilhelm Leibniz Prize winners
People from Fribourg